The 2021 NXT: The Great American Bash was the ninth Great American Bash professional wrestling event produced by WWE, and 23rd Great American Bash event overall. It was held exclusively for wrestlers from the promotion's NXT brand division. The event aired as a special episode of WWE's weekly television series NXT, broadcast on the USA Network. Unlike the previous year, which aired as a two-part event, the 2021 event was a one-night event that took place on July 6, 2021, at the Capitol Wrestling Center, hosted at the WWE Performance Center in Orlando, Florida. This was the second Great American Bash to air as an annual television special of NXT.

Four matches were contested at the event. In the main event, Adam Cole defeated Kyle O'Reilly.

Production

Background
The Great American Bash is a professional wrestling event established in 1985. Following WWE's acquisition of World Championship Wrestling (WCW) in March 2001, the promotion revived the event as their own annual pay-per-view (PPV) in 2004. The event continued until 2009. Following this 2009 event, The Great American Bash was discontinued as a PPV. In 2012, WWE revived the event to be held as a special episode of SmackDown, but was again discontinued. However, in 2020, WWE again revived the event, this time for the developmental brand NXT to be held as a two-part television special of the NXT program. On June 13, 2021, during TakeOver: In Your House, WWE announced that the ninth Great American Bash under the WWE banner, and 23rd overall, would return as a special episode of NXT, thus becoming an annual event for NXT. Instead of a two-night event like the previous year, it was only a one-night event held on July 6, 2021, and aired on the USA Network.

Impact of the COVID-19 pandemic

As a result of the COVID-19 pandemic that began affecting the industry in mid-March 2020, WWE had to present the majority of its programming from a behind closed doors set. NXT's programming was initially held at NXT's home base of Full Sail University in Winter Park, Florida. In October 2020, NXT's events were moved to the WWE Performance Center in Orlando, Florida, featuring the "Capitol Wrestling Center" setup, an homage to the Capitol Wrestling Corporation, the predecessor to WWE. Like the WWE ThunderDome utilized for Raw and SmackDown's programming, LED boards were placed around the Performance Center so that fans could attend virtually, while additionally, friends and family members of the wrestlers were in attendance along with a limited number of actual live fans divided from each other by plexiglass walls. In April, fan capacity was increased, and in June, WWE increased capacity further to nearly 300 spectators. Nearly all COVID-19 protocols were lifted including physical distancing requirements and the requirement to wear masks although anyone who had tested positive, within the preceding 14 days, were asked to stay home. The virtual audience was also removed with the increased live audience capacity.

Storylines
The card included matches that resulted from scripted storylines, where wrestlers portrayed heroes, villains, or less distinguishable characters in scripted events that built tension and culminated in a wrestling match or series of matches. Results were predetermined by WWE's writers on the NXT brand, while storylines were produced on WWE's weekly television show, NXT.

The main feud heading into The Great American Bash was the conflict between former Undisputed Era members Adam Cole and Kyle O'Reilly. At the end of TakeOver: Vengeance Day, Cole attacked O'Reilly, which would eventually lead to the breakup of The Undisputed Era. At Night 2 of TakeOver: Stand & Deliver, O'Reilly defeated Cole in an unsanctioned match. Cole returned on the June 1 episode of NXT, where he interrupted a triple threat match involving O'Reilly to determine the number one contender for the NXT Championship at TakeOver: In Your House. This turned the title match into a fatal five-way match, where they failed to win the title. On the following episode of NXT, the two brawled backstage, and NXT General Manager William Regal scheduled a rematch between the two for The Great American Bash.

At TakeOver: In Your House, LA Knight defeated Cameron Grimes to win the re-introduced Million Dollar Championship. On the following episode of NXT, Ted DiBiase presented the title to Knight, who then cut a promo about winning the title before turning on DiBiase, who was then saved by Grimes. In a video uploaded to WWE's YouTube channel, it was shown that Grimes had apologized to DiBiase following the match at TakeOver: In Your House. The following week, Knight talked about his attack on DiBiase while also disrespecting Grimes. On the June 29 episode, after Grimes' match, Knight confronted Grimes and called him a loser. Grimes then challenged Knight for the Million Dollar Championship. Knight accepted on the condition that if Grimes lost, Grimes would become Knight's butler. Grimes accepted the match for The Great American Bash.

Results

References

External links 
 

The Great American Bash
2021 in professional wrestling in Florida
2021 in professional wrestling
Events in Orlando, Florida
July 2021 events in the United States
Professional wrestling in Orlando, Florida
WWE NXT